William Dixon may refer to:

People 
William Henry Dixon (priest) (1783–1854), Church of England clergyman and antiquary
William Dixon (Assemblyman) (1808–1887), English-born Wisconsin politician
William Hepworth Dixon (1821–1879), English social and prison commentator
William T. Dixon (1833–1909), American educator and Baptist minister in Brooklyn, New York
William W. Dixon (1838–1910), U.S. Representative from Montana
Billy Dixon (1850–1913), American scout and hunter, civilian recipient of the Medal of Honor
William Gray Dixon (1854–1928), Scottish Presbyterian minister
William Dixon (cricketer) (1856–1938), New Zealand cricketer
William Dixon (Australian politician) (1860–1935), Australian politician
William Macneile Dixon (1866–1946), British author
William Taylor Dixon (1879–1959), independent faith missionary to China and minister in the United States
William C. Dixon (1904–1997), American government antitrust lawyer and judge on the Ohio Supreme Court
Billy Dixon (footballer, born 1905) (1905–1956), English footballer (Grimsby Town, Barrow AFC)
Willie Dixon (1915–1992), U.S. blues musician
Bill Dixon (1925–2010), American musician and artist
William Dixon (priest) (born 1939), Dean of Barbados
Billy Dixon (footballer, born 1941), Irish footballer (Shamrock Rovers)

Other 
William Dixon manuscript, the earliest manuscript of bagpipe music from the UK, compiled in 1733 by a piper from Northumberland
Billy Dixon and the Tropics, a nom de disque for the 1950s pop/rock group Four Lovers who evolved into The Four Seasons

See also
William Dickson (disambiguation)
William Dixson (1870–1952), Australian businessman and benefactor
William Dixon Allott, mayor of Adelaide, Australia